a.k.a.  was a 20th-century Japanese labor leader, politician and writer, participating in many of the left-wing movements of the era.

References 
 Japan: An Illustrated Encyclopedia, Kodansha, 1993, v. 1, p. 45.

1887 births
1981 deaths
Members of the House of Representatives from Tokyo
People from Yokohama
Members of the House of Representatives (Empire of Japan)
Social Democratic Party (Japan) politicians
Japanese Communist Party politicians
Meiji socialists